Bardsley is a suburban area of Oldham, in Greater Manchester, England.

It lies on undulating land by the River Medlock, on Oldham's southern boundary with Ashton-under-Lyne in the Metropolitan Borough of Tameside.

History
The place name itself is derived from the Anglo-Saxon given name "Beornraëd" plus the Anglo-Saxon word "leah" which means wood clearing, therefore meaning "a woodland clearing of a man called Beornraëd".

Governance
Lying within the historic county boundaries of Lancashire from a very early time, Bardsley anciently formed a hamlet within the township and parish of Ashton-under-Lyne.

Following the Local Government Act 1894, Bardsley constituted a civil parish within the Limehurst Rural District and administrative county of Lancashire. Limehurst was included in the Ashton-under-Lyne Poor Law Union.

In 1951, owing to urbanisation, part of Bardsley was incorporated into the neighbouring County Borough of Oldham and in 1954, Limehurst Rural District was abolished with the rest of the parish of Bardsley joining the County Borough of Oldham.

Following the Local Government Act 1972, the County Borough of Oldham was abolished and Bardsley became part of the newly formed Metropolitan Borough of Oldham in Greater Manchester.

Transport
Three bus services serve Bardsley with all three terminating at Ashton-under-Lyne. First Greater Manchester's frequent 409 service runs to Rochdale via Oldham and Royton.

Another First service, the 419, runs to Middleton via Hathershaw, Chadderton and Mills Hill.

Bluebird's 396 service runs to Newton Heath via Fitton Hill, Hollinwood and Failsworth.

The nearest railway station is Ashton-under-Lyne which provides links to Manchester, Southport and Huddersfield.

External links
Historic boundaries of Bardsley civil parish: http://www.visionofbritain.org.uk/unit/10332655/boundary

References 

Areas of Oldham